Harpalus chrysopus is a species of ground beetle in the subfamily Harpalinae. It was described by Reitter in 1877.

References

chrysopus
Beetles described in 1877